Ernest Goes to Jail is a 1990 American comedy film directed by John Cherry and starring Jim Varney. It is the fourth film to feature the character Ernest P. Worrell. It was shot in Nashville and Tennessee State Prison.

Plot
Ernest P. Worrell is employed as a night janitor at the Howard Country Bank & Trust where his friends and neighbors, Chuck and Bobby, work as security guards. While trying to use a floor polisher, Ernest makes an enormous mess that results in him being electrocuted with strange results. His body becomes magnetized and while trying to escape the various objects attracted to him, he goes into the vault but a pair of safety deposit boxes knock him out just as the effect wears off.

The next morning, co-worker Charlotte Sparrow, whom Ernest is smitten with, askes him out to “just dinner” to discuss Ernest’s desire to move up and become a clerk. However this goal is hampered by his knuckleheaded antics and the ire earned from bank president, Oscar Pendlesmythe. Meanwhile at the Dracup Penitentiary, convict Rubin Bartlett kills a fellow prisoner and seeks help from Felix Nash, a convicted bank robber and death row inmate. Unable to offer anything in return, Rubin goes on trial. At the same time, Ernest receives a summons to perform jury duty on the same trial. In the courtroom, Rubin notices Ernest has an uncanny resemblance to Nash. In league with Bartlett and Nash, the defense makes a successful motion for the jury to see the scene of the crime so the switch can be made.

Nash and his silent yet hulking henchman, Lyle, make the switch. Nash coerces the jury to acquit Rubin while Ernest, unknowingly at first, takes Nash's place. Upon realizing his predicament, Ernest makes a series of unsuccessful attempts to escape the prison while also trying to keep up the ruse that he is Nash out of fear of reprisal. At the same time, Nash is planning to rob the bank but gets distracted trying to keep a suspicious Bobby and his smooth, un-Ernest like demeanor from exposing him.

In prison, Ernest is taken to be executed via the electric chair. Having given up on escaping and trying to convince the warden of his identity, Ernest makes a final speech and is electrocuted. The massive voltage puts him in a kind of trance and he becomes magnetized again only this time he can zap bolts of electricity from his fingers. He uses this power to comically subdue the guards and blast a hole in the main gate. Rubin attempts to stop him but Lyle, speaking up for the first time, steps in and knocks him out. He tells Ernest to flee so he can stop Nash and save his friends. He also rejects Ernest’s request to come with him, saying his place is in the prison but that he will miss him. Ernest escapes and after a changing out of his prison uniform, races to the bank with his dog, Rimshot.

Nash has set up an explosive and handcuffed Chuck to the vault. Charlotte arrives, after an earlier encounter with Nash at Ernest’s home that went bad, and is taken hostage as well. Just as Ernest arrives so do the prison officials. Bobby appears and almost gains the upper hand over Nash but fails. An electrified security cage that Chuck and Bobby installed also fails as Ernest and Nash fight. Nash throws Ernest against the cage and is electrocuted again. This time his body is electromagnetically polarized allowing him to levitate erratically. Ernest uses the floor polisher against Nash, dragging him up along the ceiling, resulting in him being dropped out cold.
With seconds left on the explosive timer, Ernest heroically grabs it and flies up and out of the bank to a safe distance but it explodes in the night sky. Everyone is devastated that Ernest may have been killed but Nash recovers and holds the group at gunpoint. Before he can use Charlotte as a hostage, Ernest’s charred body lands on Nash. He poignantly claims: “I came. I saw. I got blowed up.” before fainting.

Cast
 Jim Varney as Ernest P. Worrell / Felix Nash / Auntie Nelda
 Gailard Sartain as Chuck
 Bill Byrge as Bobby 
 Barbara Tyson as Charlotte Sparrow (credited as "Barbara Bush")
 Barry Scott as Rubin Bartlett
 Randall "Tex" Cobb as Lyle
 Dan Leegant as Oscar Pendlesmythe 
 Charles Napier as Warden Carmichael
 Jackie Welch as Judge 
 Jim Conrad as Eddie 
 Emily Corbishdale as Betty McGee
 Andy Stahl as Jerry (as Andrew Stahl) 
 Bob Babbitt as Washing Con 
 Myke R. Mueller as Vinnie (as Myke Mueller) 
 Chambers Stevens as Jury Man (uncredited)
 Buck Ford as Rubin's Attorney (uncredited)

Production
Principal photography took place in Nashville from September 25 until November 15, 1989.<ref
 name="AFI"></ref> A former manufacturing plant in Nashville was converted into a 100,000-square-foot studio by the production designer.  This is where the sets were built for, Howard County Bank & Trust, two three-story jail cell tiers, an electrocution room, and Ernest's house. Scenes were shot at the Tennessee State Prison for three days.

Reception

Critical response
Caryn James, reviewing the film in The New York Times, commented that "Ernest Goes to Jail so resembles a high-spirited cartoon that it is likely to be more amusing to children and less painfully obnoxious for parents than its predecessors." She considered the film's heavy focus on slapstick humor and comedic interactions with inanimate objects to be the biggest improvement, saying that while the film is not particularly inventive with this sort of humor, it would appeal to its young target audience more. Writing for the Sun-Sentinel, Roger Hurlburt agreed that Ernest Goes to Jail is a major improvement over the first two Ernest films, due to Ernest's comic mishaps being tied into a solid storyline, but cautioned that it is still a highly uneven work. He elaborated that "Undeniably, Varney is an adroit physical comedian with a flair for making faces, contorting his lean body and evoking a sensation of the heebie-jeebies at appropriate moments.", resulting in a number of inventive laughs, but that in the more dialogue-heavy scenes the characters become dull. In contradiction to Hurlburt, Ty Burr of Entertainment Weekly said that the use of a full plotline in Ernest Goes to Jail makes it a worse film than the previous two Ernest installments, arguing that the Ernest character is best used in short gags and could never become a sympathetic hero. He gave the film a D.

Box office
The film debuted in third place during its opening weekend, earning $6,143,372. Its total gross was $25,029,569.

Home media 

Earnest Goes to Jail was released on Laserdisc and VHS in January 1991. The film was released on Blu-ray for the first time on March 29, 2011 in a single disc Double Feature set along with Ernest Goes to Camp.

References

External links

 
 
 

1990 films
American children's comedy films
American prison comedy films
1990s English-language films
Ernest P. Worrell films
Films about capital punishment
Films about lookalikes
Films directed by John R. Cherry III
Films shot in Tennessee
Touchstone Pictures films
1990s American films